Jędrzej is a variant Polish form of the given name Andrzej (Andrew).

Notable individuals with the given name Jędrzej

Jędrzej Śniadecki
Jędrzej Moraczewski
Jędrzej Gruszczyński
Jędrzej Maćkowiak
Jędrzej Giertych
Jędrzej Kitowicz
Jędrzej Jędrych

Polish masculine given names